Drumcrow is a townland lying within the civil parish of Kilcronaghan, County Londonderry, Northern Ireland. It lies in the north of the parish with the Moyola River running along its northern boundary. It is bounded by the townlands of; Drumballyhagan, Drumballyhagan Clark, Drumconready, Kirley Lisnamuck, Moneyshanere, and Moybeg Kirley. It was apportioned to the Vintners company.

The townland was part of Tobermore electoral ward of the former Magherafelt District Council, however in 1926 it was part of Tobermore district electoral division as part of the Maghera division of Magherafelt Rural District. It was also part of the historic barony of Loughinsholin.

Etymology
Drumcrow is suggested to derive its name from the Irish Droim Cró, meaning "bloody ridge". This is based upon the context of earlier forms of the name, which suggested the use of the noun cró, which means "blood, gore". An early Irish poem makes mention of a Droim Cró (now Drumcree) in County Westmeath, which was the site of a battle with the editor remarking that the final element of the name meant "blood, gore". Ridges where an ideal defence-attack position, where the defender could rain missiles upon an enemy that had to climb uphill, and quickly take up an offensive position with a downhill charge.

History

See also
Kilcronaghan
List of townlands in Tobermore
Tobermore

References

Townlands of County Londonderry
Civil parish of Kilcronaghan